Andrei Anatolyevich Krupenin (born 29 January 1981) is a former Russian professional football player.

Club career
He played two seasons in the Russian Football National League for FC Khimki and FC Kristall Smolensk.

References

External links
 

1981 births
Sportspeople from Pskov
Living people
Russian footballers
Association football defenders
FC Khimki players
FC Kristall Smolensk players
FC Lukhovitsy players
FC Dynamo Vologda players
FC Dynamo Saint Petersburg players